Hard Knocks is a 1980 Australian film directed by Don McLennan.

Production
Director Don McLennan got the idea to make the film from a story in the newspaper about an ex-prisoner who becomes a model. He wrote a script and got the money to make a 50-minute film but decided to turn it into a feature. It was made for $35,000 and Trevor Lucas of Andromeda Films paid for post production.

Soundtrack

References

External links

Hard Knocks at Oz Movies

Australian drama films
1980 films
1980s English-language films
Films directed by Don McLennan
1980s Australian films